Vladimir Vlado Janevski is a popular Macedonian singer. He was North Macedonia's first Eurovision contestant, finishing 19th in Birmingham at the 1998 Eurovision Song Contest with the song "Ne Zori, Zoro".

Biography
Vlado Janevski was born on 27 November 1960 in Skopje, resided most of his adult years in Čair and as of 2021 moved to Gevgelija. He majored in English language and literature at the university of Ss. Cyril and Methodius. He is fluent in English, German, Italian and Russian. He plays the guitar, piano and drums. He was a member of the popular bands Tost Sendvich (1976) and Bon-Ton (1986) as a drummer, and Fotomodel (1989) and Lastovica (1992) as a singer.

He has participated in a number of festivals in Macedonia and other Ex-Yugoslav countries. He participated in Jugovizija in Belgrade in 1992 and also had revival participations in Belarus on Slavjanski Bazar in 1994, 1995 and 1996. In Macedonia, he took part in Interfest in 1994 where he got the grand prize, and on Makfest where got the second prize and the first in 1995. He took place in the first Skopje Fest 1998 with the song "Ne Zori, Zoro" and won the contest which allowed him to represent Macedonia for the first time in the Eurovision Song Contest 1998. Vlado Janevski is under an exclusive recording contract with Croatia Records as of 2019.

Eurovision 1998

Vlado won the Skopje Fest in 1998 and he went to Birmingham where Macedonia debuted in the Eurovision Song Contest. The song Ne Zori, Zoro finished in 19th place and failed to qualify Macedonia for the Eurovision Song Contest 1999.

Songwriting

Ever since the beginning of his solo career Vlado has been writing most of the music and all the lyrics for his songs. Even though he has often been referred to as "the most romantic songwriter and lyricist in the history of macedonian popular music" he described himself as "a mere scribbler of love songs". The secret of his long-lasting success with the wide audience probably lies in the mystic beauty of his ballads combined with the sensuality of his velvety baritone voice.

Discography

Albums

 Parče Duša (1993)
 Se Najdobro (1996)
 Daleku E Neboto (1996)
 Ima Nešto Posilno Od Se (2002)
 Vakov Ili Takov (2004)
 Povtorno Se Zaljubuvam Vo Tebe (2006)

Singles
1998: Ne Zori, Zoro
2007: Zemjo makedonska
2011: Bulki
2012: Pjer
2014: E, ama jas te sakam tebe
2016: Ajde vodi me
2017: Posledna zabluda
2018: Glaven grad na tagata
2019: Otkako si negova
2020: Nedostasuvaš
2020: Ljubi,ljubi
2021: Bez tebe ne me biva
2022: Nenormalen

References

http://www.vladojanevski.mk

See also
Music of the Republic of Macedonia

 

1960 births
Living people
Eurovision Song Contest entrants of 1998
Eurovision Song Contest entrants for North Macedonia
20th-century Macedonian male singers
Macedonian pop singers
Musicians from Skopje
Ss. Cyril and Methodius University of Skopje alumni
21st-century Macedonian male singers